Major General Paul J. Fletcher is a retired senior United States Air Force officer, who served as Vice Commander, 3rd Air Force, from 2006 to 2007. He was commissioned through the Washington State University United States Air Force Reserve Officers' Training Corps program. His experience includes airlift operations; programming; acquisition management; joint planning for modeling and simulation support for training; and standing up the C-130 Weapons Instructor Course. He has commanded at the squadron, group and wing levels, and has flown more than 3,500 hours, primarily in the C-130E.

Education
1972 Bachelor of Science degree in civil engineering, Washington State University
1976 Squadron Officer School, Maxwell Air Force Base, Alabama
1981 Master of Arts degree in logistics management, Central Michigan University
1984 Armed Forces Staff College, Norfolk, Virginia
1986 National Security Management Course
1992 Industrial College of the Armed Forces, Fort Lesley J. McNair, Washington, D.C.
2000 Program for Senior Managers in Government, John F. Kennedy School of Government, Harvard University, Cambridge, Massachusetts
2002 Joint Flag Officer Warfighting Course, Maxwell AFB, Alabama

Assignments

January 1973 - December 1973, student, undergraduate pilot training, Webb AFB, Texas
December 1973 - May 1974, student, C-130 pilot training, Little Rock AFB, Arkansas
May 1974 - February 1979, pilot, aircraft commander, instructor and evaluator pilot, 39th Tactical Airlift Squadron, Pope AFB, North Carolina
February 1979 - January 1984, program manager for C-130 foreign and domestic sales, Aeronautical Systems Division, Wright-Patterson AFB, Ohio
January 1984 - June 1984, student, Armed Forces Staff College, Norfolk, Virginia
June 1984 - July 1988, Chief of Combat Operations, 435th Tactical Airlift Wing, later, chief pilot and assistant operations officer, 37th Tactical Airlift Squadron, Rhein-Main Air Base, West Germany
July 1988 - June 1989, director of operations, 34th Tactical Airlift Training Group, and executive officer, 314th Tactical Airlift Wing, Little Rock AFB, Arkansas
June 1989 - August 1991, Commander, 62nd Tactical Airlift Squadron, Little Rock AFB, Arkansas
August 1991 - June 1992, student, Industrial College of the Armed Forces, Fort Lesley J. McNair, Washington, D.C.
June 1992 - July 1994, strategic planner, Operational Plans and Interoperability Directorate (J7), Office of the Joint Chiefs of Staff, Washington D.C.
July 1994 - June 1995, Commandant (first), Combat Aerial Delivery School, Little Rock AFB, Arkansas
June 1995 - January 1997, Commander, 314th Operations Group, Little Rock AFB, Arkansas
January 1997 - September 1998, deputy director of plans and programs, Headquarters Air Mobility Command, Scott AFB, Illinois
September 1998 - July 2001, Commander, 314th Airlift Wing, Little Rock AFB, Arkansas
July 2001 - August 2003, director of plans and programs, Headquarters Pacific Air Forces, Hickam AFB, Hawaii
September 2003 - October 2005, Assistant Deputy Chief of Staff for Plans and Programs, Headquarters U.S. Air Force, Washington, D.C.
November 2005 - July 2006, Vice Commander, 16th Air Force, Royal Air Force Mildenhall, England
July 2006 - December 2006, acting Commander, 16th Air Force, Ramstein Air Base, Germany
December 2006 - November 2007 (Retired), Vice Commander, 3rd Air Force, RAF Mildenhall, England

Flight information
Rating: Command Pilot
Flight hours: More than 3,500
Aircraft flown: T-37, T-38, C-21 and C-130

Major awards and decorations
 Air Force Distinguished Service Medal (with oak leaf cluster)
 Legion of Merit Legion of Merit (with oak leaf cluster)
 Defense Meritorious Service Medal
 Meritorious Service Medal with (2 olc)
 Air Force Commendation Medal with oak leaf cluster
 Humanitarian Service Medal

Effective dates of promotion

References
Col. Paul Fletcher, USAF, (Congressional Record)
Major General Paul J. Fletcher
Paul Fletcher (middle), 16th Air Force vice commander

External links
Official Air Force biography

Living people
National War College alumni
People from Spokane County, Washington
Recipients of the Air Force Distinguished Service Medal
Recipients of the Legion of Merit
United States Air Force Academy alumni
United States Air Force generals
Washington State University alumni
Year of birth missing (living people)